Gregory Abelevich Freiman (born 1926) is a Russian mathematician known for his work in additive number theory, in particular, for proving Freiman's theorem. He is Professor Emeritus in Tel Aviv University.

Biographical sketch

Freiman was born in Kazan in 1926. He graduated from Moscow University in 1949, and obtained his Candidate of Sciences in Kazan University in 1956. From 1956 he worked in Elabuga, and in 1965 he defended his Doctor of Sciences degree under the joint supervision of Alexander Gelfond, Alexey G. Postnikov, and Alexander Buchstab. From 1967 he worked in Vladimir, and later in Kalinin (now Tver).

In the 1970s and early 1980s Freiman participated in the refusenik movement. His samizdat essay It seems I am a Jew, described the discrimination against Jewish mathematicians in the Soviet Union. It was published in the US in 1980.

Later, Freiman was driven out of Russia for his different views. He chose Israel as his new home country, leaving his son, daughter, and wife. In Israel he became professor in Tel Aviv University, and met a woman who he then married. They are still together to this day.

Selected publications

 
 with Boris M. Schein: 
 
 with Boris L. Granovsky:

Notes

Living people
1926 births
Russian Jews
Israeli people of Russian-Jewish descent
Israeli Jews
Israeli mathematicians
Number theorists
Academic staff of Tel Aviv University
Additive combinatorialists